Møre og Romsdal Hospital Trust is a health trust which covers Møre og Romsdal, Norway. The trust is owned by Central Norway Regional Health Authority and is headquartered in Ålesund. It operates four hospitals: Kristiansund Hospital, Molde Hospital, Ålesund Hospital and Volda Hospital. The agency was created on 1 July 2011 when Nordmøre og Romsdal Hospital Trust and Sunnmøre Hospital Trust were merged.

References

External links
 Official website

Health trusts of Norway
Companies based in Ålesund
2011 establishments in Norway
Hospitals established in 2011
Companies established in 2011
Government agencies established in 2011